Paul John White (4 July 1893 – 25 October 1973) was an Australian rules footballer who played with St Kilda in the Victorian Football League (VFL).

Notes

External links 

1893 births
1973 deaths
Australian rules footballers from Victoria (Australia)
St Kilda Football Club players